The Luer taper is a standardized system of small-scale fluid fittings used for making leak-free connections between a male-taper fitting and its mating female part on medical and laboratory instruments, including hypodermic syringe tips and needles or stopcocks and needles. Currently ISO 80369 governs the Luer standards and testing methods.

History 
Named after the Lüer-family who founded the medical instrument maker Maison Lüer in Paris, the two piece syringe invented by either the employed instrument maker Karl Schneider or Jeanne Lüer together with the glass blower Fournier, it was patented by Jeanne's husband  Hermann Wülfing Lüer in 1894, with international patents taken out the following years. It originated as a 6% taper fitting for glass bottle stoppers (so one side is at 1.72 degrees to the centerline). Key features of Luer taper connectors are defined in the ISO 594 standards. It is also defined in the DIN and EN standard 1707:1996 and 20594-1:1993.
In 1930, Fairleigh S. Dickinson of Becton Dickinson, which had exclusive rights of marketing the Luer-syringe in the United States of America since 1898, patented the "Luer-Lok"; a steel fitting that secures the needle to the syringe.

Variants
There are two varieties of Luer taper connections: locking and slipping. Their trade names are confusingly similar to the nonproprietary names. "Luer-Lok" and "Luer-slip" are registered trademarks of Becton Dickinson. "Luer-Lok" style connectors are often generically referred to as "luer lock" (always in lower case), while "luer-slip" style connectors may be generically referred to as "slip tip". Luer lock fittings are securely joined by means of a tabbed hub on the female fitting which screws into threads in a sleeve on the male fitting.  The Luer lock fitting was developed in the United States by Fairleigh S. Dickinson. 'Luer lock' style connectors are divided into two types "one piece luer lock" and "two piece luer lock" or "rotating collar luer lock". One piece Luer lock comes as a single mold, and locking is achieved by rotating the entire luer connector or system. In two piece luer lock, a free rotating collar with threads is assembled to the luer and the locking is achieved by rotating the collar.

Slip tip (Luer-slip) fittings simply conform to Luer taper dimensions and are pressed together and held by friction (they have no threads). Luer components are manufactured from either metal or plastic and are available from many companies worldwide.

See also 
Record connector, older standard for non-needle small diameter connections in Europe.

References

Biomedical engineering